Simon John Renshaw (born 6 March 1974) is a former English cricketer. Renshaw was a right-handed batsman who was a right-arm medium-fast bowler.

Renshaw first represented his home county of Cheshire in the 1994 NatWest Trophy. During the 1996 County Championship season Renshaw was signed by Hampshire. Renshaw would go on to play 38 County Championship matches and 49 one-day matches for the club. Renshaw spent four years at the club before being released in 2000. In 2001 he rejoined Cheshire, representing them in one-day matches and Minor Counties Championship matches. He left Cheshire at the end of the 2004 season, joining Staffordshire in 2005. Renshaw retired from the game at the end of that season.

External links
Simon Renshaw on Cricinfo
Simon Renshaw on CricketArchive

1974 births
Living people
People from Bebington
English cricketers
Cheshire cricketers
Hampshire cricketers
Staffordshire cricketers
NBC Denis Compton Award recipients
Hampshire Cricket Board cricketers
British Universities cricketers